Neil Reid may refer to:

People
Neil Reid (born 1959), Scottish musician
D. Neil Reid (1900–1981), American politician
Neil E. Reid (1871–1956), American jurist

Other
Neil Reid (album), 1972 album

See also
Neel Reid (1885–1926), American architect
Neil Reidman (born 1970s), British actor